James David Barnfather (22 July 1896 – 21 August 1957) was an English cricketer.  Barnfather was a right-handed batsman who bowled right-arm fast-medium.  He was born in Leicester, Leicestershire.

Barnfather played 5 first-class matches for Essex in the 1924 County Championship, making his debut against Kent and playing his final match against Leicestershire.  In his 5 first-class matches, he scored 50 runs at a batting average of 25.00, with a high score of 28*.  With the ball he took 13 wickets at a bowling average of 27.30, with best figures of 6/32, in what was his only five wicket haul.

He died in Thurrock, Essex on 21 August 1957.

References

External links
James Barnfather at Cricinfo
James Barnfather at CricketArchive

1896 births
1957 deaths
Cricketers from Leicester
English cricketers
Essex cricketers